Rainer Schmidt (born 18 February 1965) is a retired German para table tennis player who played in international level events. He participated in four Summer Paralympic Games and has won three Paralympic titles. He has also won five World titles and nine European titles in mostly team events with Jochen Wollmert.

During his sporting career, he was a left handed player with a metal bar attached onto his left upper arm and has a prosthetic on his right leg.

References

1965 births
Living people
Sportspeople from Bonn
Paralympic table tennis players of Germany
Table tennis players at the 1992 Summer Paralympics
Table tennis players at the 2000 Summer Paralympics
Table tennis players at the 2004 Summer Paralympics
Table tennis players at the 2008 Summer Paralympics
Medalists at the 1992 Summer Paralympics
Medalists at the 2000 Summer Paralympics
Medalists at the 2004 Summer Paralympics
Paralympic medalists in table tennis
Paralympic gold medalists for Germany
Paralympic silver medalists for Germany
German male table tennis players